The Special Advisor for International Children's Issues is a foreign policy position created by Secretary of State Hillary Clinton and announced on July 1, 2010.  Susan S. Jacobs is the first person to fill the newly created role of Special Advisor for International Children's Issues.  Working with the Office of Children's Issues, the Special Advisor actively engages with foreign government officials to protect the welfare and interests of children.

See also
 International child abduction in the United States
 Office of Children's Issues
 Hague Abduction Convention
 Hague Adoption Convention

References

 
2010 establishments in Washington, D.C.